Phyllis Kennedy (June 16, 1914 – December 29, 1998) was an American film actress.

Early life
She was born on June 16, 1914 in Detroit, Michigan. Following her high school graduation in 1932, she got employment as a clothes model in a local department store. During her modeling period, one of her friends recommended that she try her hand at acting. She began her acting career on the New York stage in a small role in a 1935 production of Jane Eyre. Soon, she decided to try her hand in the film industry. Around 1935, she broke her back while dancing in a show in Denver and was told she would never dance again. Two years later, she was able to dance again.

Hollywood years
Kennedy was noticed by Ginger Rogers when she performed as a chorus girl in Shall We Dance? She did some comedy dances for Rogers offstage, which impressed the other actress. This relationship led to her being cast as a maid in Stage Door with Rogers and Katharine Hepburn. She was eventually signed onto RKO Radio. She then began getting parts in films playing dimwitted servants; most notably in such films as Vivacious Lady (1938), Mother Carey's Chickens (1938), Love Affair (1939), East Side of Heaven (1939), and Anne of Windy Poplars (1940).

Well into the 1940s Kennedy made over twenty film appearances although a lot of her film roles were uncredited. In later years she made appearances on shows like the Lucy-Desi Comedy Hour, The Missourians, and The Lone Ranger. She also appeared as an uncredited Cockney in the film My Fair Lady (1964). Her last screen appearance was in Finian's Rainbow in 1968 in an uncredited role.

Later years and personal life
Kennedy married to Paul Card Howell in 1944, they had 2 children. During her time in Hollywood, although she never elevated to real star status, she became friends with a great many reputable actors. They included: Lucille Ball, Katharine Hepburn, William Powell, James Stewart, Ginger Rogers, Fred Astaire, James Cagney, Rosalind Russell, and Loretta Young. 

Kennedy was a Methodist and a registered Republican who supported Dwight Eisenhower's campaign during the 1952 presidential election.

After her 1968 retirement, she continued to live comfortably in Los Angeles, CA for the remainder of her life. In her later years she took up painting, collected commemorative spoons, and she had a Cavalier King Charles Spaniel named Dorian; she had a love for animals and when she was able she would make contributions to the Doris Day Animal League; Day was one of Kennedy's Hollywood friends. She had a deep love for letter writing and she would frequently write letters to her friends and relatives. Being able to "adjust to the times" she traded in her typewriter and learned how to use a computer which she would later own and type her letters from there with the help of a housekeeper who would show her how to adjust the margins for her Christmas letters.. Her cremains were scattered into the Garden of Roses at Westwood Village Memorial Park Cemetery.

Partial filmography
 Stage Door (1937) - Maid
 Vivacious Lady (1938)
 Mother Carey's Chickens (1938) - Annabelle
 Love Affair (1939)
 East Side of Heaven (1939)
 Laugh Your Blues Away (1942) - Patricia Conklin
 Yankee Doodle Dandy (1942) - (uncredited)
 An American Romance (1944) - Receptionist
 The Heavenly Body (1944) - Maid
 Faithful in My Fashion (1946) - Secretary
 Chicago Deadline (1949) - Maid
 A Dangerous Profession (1949) - Maid

References

Citations

Sources

External links

1914 births
1998 deaths
20th-century American actresses
Actresses from Detroit
Actresses from Los Angeles
Female models from Michigan
American stage actresses
American film actresses
American television actresses
American women comedians
American Methodists
20th-century American memoirists
American women memoirists
20th-century American women writers
Burials at Westwood Village Memorial Park Cemetery
American female dancers
Comedians from California
20th-century American comedians
20th-century American dancers
California Republicans
Michigan Republicans